Gun laws in Nebraska regulate the sale, possession, and use of firearms and ammunition in the state of Nebraska in the United States.

Summary table

Nebraska laws
In Nebraska, to purchase a handgun, a permit to purchase is required. Rifles and shotguns are not subject to gun laws more restrictive than those at the federal level. As of January 1, 2007, Nebraska became the 48th state to legalize concealed carry; permits to carry are being issued by the Nebraska State Patrol. NFA firearms (machine guns, short barreled shotguns, short barreled rifles, and silencers) are legal to own as long as they are compliant with federal law. Open carry is allowed without a permit except in areas restricted by local government. Concealed carry permit holders are exempt from any local open carry restrictions. 

Residents of the city of Omaha are required to register their handguns, unless that resident possesses a State of Nebraska Concealed Handgun Permit.

In Lincoln, municipal code section 9.36.100 prohibits the possession of a firearm by anyone who has been convicted of certain misdemeanors within the last ten years. These include stalking, violation of an order of protection, impersonating a police officer, and public indecency. The Lancaster County Sheriff will not issue a Nebraska permit to purchase a handgun if the applicant is a Lincoln resident and is prohibited by this law from possessing firearms.

Some counties have adopted Second Amendment sanctuary resolutions.

See also
 Law of Nebraska

References

Nebraska law
Nebraska